Kemp B. Johnson House is a historic home located near Fuquay-Varina, Wake County, North Carolina.  The house was built about 1896, and is a -story, double pile, Queen Anne style frame dwelling. It has a high hipped roof and full-width front porch with intricate sawnwork decoration.  A one-story, side-gable, three-bay wing was added about 1905.

It was listed on the National Register of Historic Places in 2005.

References

Houses on the National Register of Historic Places in North Carolina
Queen Anne architecture in North Carolina
Houses completed in 1896
Houses in Wake County, North Carolina
National Register of Historic Places in Wake County, North Carolina